The Banjo Bowl is the annual rematch game between the Winnipeg Blue Bombers and Saskatchewan Roughriders of the Canadian Football League (CFL) after the Labour Day Classic. While the traditional Labour Day Classic game is always played on the Sunday before Labour Day at Mosaic Stadium in Regina, Saskatchewan (previously held at Taylor Field), there is usually a rematch on the following weekend between these two rival prairie teams at IG Field (previously held at Canad Inns Stadium) in Winnipeg, Manitoba.

History
The "Banjo Bowl" moniker was coined by Blue Bombers board member David Asper in early 2004, inspired by an infamous comment made by Bombers placekicker Troy Westwood in the week prior to a 2003 Western Division Semi-final game between the two teams. Westwood was quoted in the media as saying that people from Regina were "a bunch of banjo-pickin' inbreds." He later apologized halfheartedly for those comments, saying that "the vast majority of the people in Saskatchewan have no idea how to play the banjo."  This further fuelled the Winnipeg–Saskatchewan football rivalry and has made the rematch game even more of an event. The game is sponsored by the Manitoba Liquor & Lotteries Corporation. The game has been sold out every year since 2005. As of the 2022 season, Winnipeg leads the series 11–7.

As on Labour Day weekend when many Winnipeg fans visit Regina to support the Bombers, many Saskatchewan fans visit Winnipeg the following weekend to support the 'Riders. Many come, tongue-in-cheek, with banjos.

Despite not being an official event, the Canadian Football League website promotes the game by referring to it as "Banjo Bowl" in some of its online coverage as does the league's official television broadcaster, TSN. In 2013, the Premier of Saskatchewan, Brad Wall, joined in the spirit of the event by posting a video on his YouTube channel making reference to the rivalry and the Banjo Bowl game.

Results

References

Saskatchewan Roughriders
Winnipeg Blue Bombers
Sports rivalries in Canada